Racinaea seemannii is a plant species in the genus Racinaea. This species is native to Bolivia, Venezuela and Ecuador.

References

seemannii
Flora of Bolivia
Flora of Venezuela
Flora of Ecuador